Roberto Carvalho Cauê (born April 22, 1987), known as just Cauê, is a Brazilian football defender playing for Luziânia.

Career

Early career
Cauê started his career by playing with Internacional from Porto Alegre.  While still a youngster, he was part of the Brazilian U-17 national team, having made two appearances for them.  In 2007, he played with Ceará Sporting Club in the Campeonato Brasileiro Série B.  The following year, he moved abroad for the first time, joining Romanian side FC Politehnica Iași, however he failed to make a debut in the Liga I.  After this short spell in Europe, he moved back to Brazil and during the following year and a half he has represented Clube Atlético Metropolitano, ABC Futebol Clube and Nacional Futebol Clube.

Return to Europe
In 2009, Cauê returned to Europe, and after a successful trial, he signed with Serbian SuperLiga side OFK Beograd where he played during the 2009-10 season. At the end of the season his club finished third in the league, thus booking their place in the UEFA Europa League qualifying rounds for the next season. However due to the foreign players limit in the domestic championship, and fierce competition for a place in the starting line-up, Cauê left OFK and became one of the main signings of the newly promoted Bosnian Premier League side FK Drina Zvornik. He made seven league appearances, but at the winter break he was released and he returned to Brazil.

Back to Brazil
In early 2011 Cauê was back in Brazil. He joined Sociedade Esportiva do Gama playing in the Campeonato Brasileiro Série D. The club did a complete renovation of their stadium during 2008; however the enthusiasm did not transfer to the field and Gama performed poorly. During the summer, Cauê joined Capital Clube de Futebol, another club from Brasilia, that by August was undertaking a major project, merging with Goiás state club Cristalina Futebol Clube, and forming a new squad. This adventure lasted until early 2012, when Cauê moved to Canoas Sport Club playing in the Campeonato Gaúcho.

References

External sources
 Profile at Srbijafudbal

1987 births
Living people
Brazilian footballers
Brazilian expatriate footballers
Association football defenders
Sport Club Internacional players
Ceará Sporting Club players
FC Politehnica Iași (1945) players
Expatriate footballers in Romania
Nacional Futebol Clube players
OFK Beograd players
Serbian SuperLiga players
Expatriate footballers in Serbia
FK Drina Zvornik players
Expatriate footballers in Bosnia and Herzegovina
ABC Futebol Clube players
Sociedade Esportiva do Gama players
Canoas Sport Club players
Sobradinho Esporte Clube players
Esporte Clube Novo Hamburgo players
Ji-Paraná Futebol Clube players
Brasiliense Futebol Clube players
Rio Branco Atlético Clube players
Footballers from Porto Alegre